Dame Marie Freda Breen  (3 November 1902 – 17 June 1993) was an Australian politician who served as a Senator for Victoria from 1962 to 1968, representing the Liberal Party.

Early life
Marie Freda Chamberlin was born in St Kilda, Victoria, to Jane Maud and Frederick William Chamberlin. Her father worked as a clerk at the St Kilda City Council. Chamberlin attended St Michael's Grammar School, and then after a course in shorthand and typing found work as a law clerk. She married lawyer Robert Tweeddale Breen on 12 December 1928.

Politics
Breen was introduced to public life when her husband became Mayor of Brighton in 1941. In 1952 she served as chairman of the Federal Women's Committee of the Liberal Party of Australia. She was a Senator from July 1962 until her retirement in June 1968.

Family
She married Robert Breen on 12 December 1928. Their daughter, Jeannette Patrick (2 November 1929 – 24 May 2011), also entered politics. She was the Liberal Member for Brighton (in the Victorian Legislative Assembly), 1976–85, and as Parliamentary Secretary (1979–82).

Honours

Breen was made an Iffucer of the Order of the British Empire in 1958 and a Dame in 1979.

Breen attended St Michael's Church of England Grammar School. In 1987, when the school decided to bring in a new house, the house was named after Dame Marie Breen. In 2010 she was nominated for the Victorian Honour Roll of Women for her work as a member of the Australian Senate, representing the Liberal Party of Australia.

References

1902 births
1993 deaths
Australian Dames Commander of the Order of the British Empire
Australian politicians awarded knighthoods
Liberal Party of Australia members of the Parliament of Australia
Members of the Australian Senate
Members of the Australian Senate for Victoria
Politicians from Melbourne
Women members of the Australian Senate
People educated at St Michael's Grammar School
20th-century Australian politicians
20th-century Australian women politicians
People from St Kilda, Victoria